Meek's lorikeet (Vini meeki) is a species of parrot in the family Psittaculidae.
It is found on Bougainville Island in Papua New Guinea and the Solomon Islands.
Its natural habitats are subtropical or tropical moist lowland forest and subtropical or tropical moist montane forest.
It is threatened by habitat loss.

Taxonomy
This species was formerly assigned to the genus Charmosyna. It was moved to the genus Vini based on a molecular phylogenetic study of the lorikeets published in 2020.

References

Meek's lorikeet
Birds of Bougainville Island
Birds of the Solomon Islands
Taxa named by Walter Rothschild
Taxa named by Ernst Hartert
Meek's lorikeet
Taxonomy articles created by Polbot
Taxobox binomials not recognized by IUCN